Gregory Rabassa, ComM (March 9, 1922 – June 13, 2016), was an American literary translator from Spanish and Portuguese to English. He taught for many years at Columbia University and Queens College.

Life and career
Rabassa was born in Yonkers, New York, to a family headed by a Cuban émigré. After serving during World War II as an OSS cryptographer, he received a bachelor's degree from Dartmouth. He earned his doctorate at Columbia University and taught there for over two decades before accepting a position at Queens College, City University of New York.

Rabassa translated literature from Spanish and Portuguese. He produced English-language versions of the works of several major Latin American novelists, including Julio Cortázar, Jorge Amado and Gabriel García Márquez. On the advice of Cortázar, García Márquez waited three years for Rabassa to schedule translating One Hundred Years of Solitude. He later declared Rabassa's translation to be superior to the Spanish original.

He received the PEN Translation Prize in 1977 and the PEN/Ralph Manheim Medal for Translation in 1982. Rabassa was honored with the Gregory Kolovakos Award from PEN American Center for the expansion of Hispanic Literature to an English-language audience in 2001.

Rabassa had a particularly close and productive working relation with Cortázar, with whom he shared lifelong passions for jazz and wordplay. For his version of Cortázar's novel, Hopscotch, Rabassa shared the inaugural U.S. National Book Award in Translation.

Rabassa taught at Queens College, from which he retired with the title Distinguished Professor Emeritus. In 2006, he was awarded the National Medal of Arts.

He wrote a memoir of his experiences as a translator, If This Be Treason: Translation and Its Dyscontents, A Memoir, which was a Los Angeles Times "Favorite Book of the Year" for 2005 and for which he received the PEN/Martha Albrand Award for the Art of the Memoir in 2006.

Translation methods 
Rabassa sometimes translated without having read the book beforehand.

In a 2006 interview with the University of Delaware, Rabassa said  "I just let the text lead me along. In my mind, the book I’m translating exists in English even before it’s translated. I just have to pull it out. I do a first draft, “write” the book as the author him- or herself would have written it if they’d spoken English. Ideally, a different style emerges for each author being translated".

Death 
Rabassa died on June 13, 2016, at a hospice in Branford, Connecticut. He was 94.

Selected translations
 Demetrio Aguilera Malta
 Seven Serpents and Seven Moons, 1979 (Siete lunas y siete serpientes)
 Juan Benet
 Return to Region
 A Meditation
 Jorge Franco
 Rosario Tijeras, 2004
 Julio Cortázar
 Hopscotch 1966 (Rayuela) —U.S. National Book Award for Translation
 A Manual for Manuel, 1978 (Libro de Manuel)
 62: A Model Kit (62: Modelo para armar)
 José Maria de Eça de Queirós
Saint Christopher
 Gabriel García Márquez
One Hundred Years of Solitude 1970 (Cien años de soledad)
The Autumn of the Patriarch 1976 (El otoño del patriarca), for which he received the Pen Translation Prize.
Chronicle of a Death Foretold 1982 (Crónica de una muerte anunciada)
Leaf Storm (La hojarasca)
Clarice Lispector
The Apple in the Dark 1967 (A maçã no escuro, 1961)
Luis Rafael Sánchez
Macho Camacho's Beat 1983 (La guaracha del Macho Camacho)
José Lezama Lima
Paradiso (Paradiso)
Mario Vargas Llosa
Conversation in the Cathedral (Conversación en la Catedral)
Machado de Assis
Posthumous Memoirs of Bras Cubas (Memórias Póstumas de Bras Cubas)
Quincas Borba (Quincas Borba)
António Lobo Antunes
Fado Alexandrino (Fado Alexandrino)
The Return of the Caravels (As Naus)
Osman Lins
Avalovara (Avalovara)
Jorge Amado
Captains of the Sands (Capitães da Areia)
Ana Teresa Torres
Dona Ines vs. Oblivion (Doña Inés contra el olvido)

Honours
 Commander of the Order of Merit, Portugal (12 November 2011)

References

External links
PEN audio interview with Gregory Rabassa, Edith Grossman and Michael F. Moore.

1922 births
2016 deaths
Columbia University faculty
Dartmouth College alumni
Columbia University alumni
People of the Office of Strategic Services
National Book Award winners
United States National Medal of Arts recipients
20th-century American translators
21st-century American translators
American people of Cuban descent
People from Yonkers, New York
Literary translators
Portuguese–English translators
Spanish–English translators
Translators of Julio Cortázar
Translators of Clarice Lispector
Translators of Mario Vargas Llosa
American military personnel of World War II